Shantinatha Charitra is a Sanskrit text that describes the life of 16th Jain tirthankara Shantinatha. It was written in 1397 CE. This text has been registered into Memory of the World Programme by UNESCO.

History 
This text was written in 1397 C.E. by Ajita Prabhasuri on paper-palm leaves and was inherited by late Muni Punyavijayji through his family. He then donated it to Lalbhai Dalpatbhai Institute of Indology in 1961.

Description 
The manuscript talks about peace, non-violence and brotherhood and was composed and written in the late 14th century. This is the oldest example of miniature painting. These illustrations are beautifully drawn in multi-colour and are examples of a highly evolved style of painting. It contains 10 images of scenes from the life of Shantinatha in the style of Jain paintings from Gujarat. The text contains miniature paintings drawn in multi-colour. This is the oldest example of Jain miniature painting. The ink used in the manuscript is gum lampblack and white paint made from mineral silver. This heritage document is written in Devanagari script.

See also 
 Shantinatha
 Jain art
 Jain literature

References

Citation

Source

Further reading

Jain texts